Boris Nepokupnoy (born 1887, date of death unknown) was a Russian Empire fencer and modern pentathlete. He competed in the individual sabre and modern pentathlon at the 1912 Summer Olympics.

References

1887 births
Year of death missing
Male fencers from the Russian Empire
Male modern pentathletes from the Russian Empire
Fencers at the 1912 Summer Olympics
Modern pentathletes at the 1912 Summer Olympics